Eric Erickson, Erik Eriksson, or similar names may refer to:

Politicians and royals 
 Eric XI of Sweden (Erik Eriksson; 1216–1250), called Eric the Lisp and Lame
 Erik Eriksson (politician) (1864–1939), Swedish politician
 Erik A. Eriksson (born 1969), Swedish politician
 Erik Eriksen (1902–1972), former Prime Minister of Denmark

Sports 

 Carl-Erik Eriksson (born 1930), Swedish bobsledder
 Eric Erickson (1892–1965), Swedish Major League pitcher
 Erik Eriksson (1897–1975), Finnish Olympic hammer thrower
 Erik Eriksen  (1904–1982), Danish footballer
 Erik Eriksson (1914–1990), Swedish footballer
 Erik Eriksson (1879–1940), Swedish Olympic swimmer
 Jonas Eriksson (born 1970), Swedish biathlon Olympian
 Lars Erik Eriksen (born 1954), Norwegian cross country skier
 Lester Eriksson (born 1942), Swedish swimmer

Arts, entertainment 
 Eric Ericson (1918–2013), Swedish choral conductor
 Eric Ericson (born 1974), Swedish actor
 Kaj-Erik Eriksen (born 1979), Canadian actor

Others 
 Eric Erickson (1890–1983), Swedish oil executive and World War II spy
 Erick Erickson (born 1975), American conservative politician, blogger, and radio commentator
 Erik Eriksen (1820–1888), Norwegian explorer
 Erik Erikson (1902–1994), Danish-German-American psychologist and psychoanalyst
 Erik Erikson, fictional central character of 2004 fantasy novel in the Avatar Chronicles trilogy Epic by Conor Kostick
Erick Erickssong, fictional character